Norine K. Hammond is a member of the Illinois House of Representatives who has served in the Illinois House of Representatives since her appointment in December 2010 to replace the late Richard P. Myers. She represents the 93rd district, which includes all or parts of Galesburg, Macomb, Mount Sterling, Rushville, Havana and Abingdon.

On December 1, 2010, Republican incumbent Rich Myers died from prostate cancer creating a vacancy in the Illinois House. The Republican Representative Committee of the 94th Representative District, composed of Republican county party chairmen, appointed Hammond to the vacancy. Hammond took the oath of office on December 14, 2010.

As of July 3, 2022, Representative Hammond is a member of the following Illinois House committees:

 Appropriations - Higher Education Committee (HAPI)
 Consumer Protection Committee (HCON)
 Financial Protection Subcommittee (HCON-FINA)
 Higher Education Committee (HHED)
 Human Services Committee (HHSV)
 Product Safety Subcommittee (HCON-PROD)
 Public Benefits Subcommittee (HHSV-PUBX)
 Public Utilities Committee (HPUB)
 Telecom/Video Subcommittee (HPUB-TVID)

References

External links
Representative Norine Hammond (R) 93rd District at the Illinois General Assembly
By session: 98th, 97th, 96th
State Representative Norine Hammond constituency site
 

Living people
Women state legislators in Illinois
Republican Party members of the Illinois House of Representatives
People from Macomb, Illinois
Year of birth missing (living people)
21st-century American politicians
21st-century American women politicians